Koena Mitra (born 7 January 1984) is an Indian actress and model who appears in Bollywood films. She is mostly known for her item numbers and for her appearance as Julie in the movie Apna Sapna Money Money.

Early life
Mitra was born in Kolkata, India, in a Bengali family. She attended Lee Strasberg Theatre and Film Institute.

Career

Modelling
Mitra started her modelling career while she was still in school.

Acting
She was featured in several music videos, including Stereo Nation’s Ishq, Aaj Ki Raat, Akh Teri, and Channo by Jasbir Jassi. Her first film appearance was a special appearance in Ram Gopal Varma's Road. In 2004, her biggest success came with Sanjay Dutt in Musafir, in the song O Saki Saki. The movie was produced by Sanjay Gupta and Sanjay Dutt.

In 2005 she appeared in the film Ek Khiladi Ek Haseena playing the role of Natasha. In the same year she appeared in her next film, Insan In 2006, she appeared in the film Apna Sapna Money Money acting as Julie. In 2007, she appeared in the films Om Shanti Om and Heyy Babyy as herself.

Reality Television
In 2009, she participated in Jhalak Dikhhla Jaa in the 3rd season. In 2019 Mitra was a celebrity contestant in Colors TV's reality show, Bigg Boss 13. She entered the house on 29 September 2019 and was evicted on 13 October.

In the media
In 2019, Mitra was among the top 10 most searched personalities in India on Google.

Filmography

Television

References

External links

 
 

1984 births
Living people
Indian film actresses
Female models from Kolkata
Mitra Koena
Bengali people
Lady Brabourne College alumni
University of Calcutta alumni
21st-century Indian actresses
Actresses in Hindi cinema
Bigg Boss (Hindi TV series) contestants